Anampses chrysocephalus, the red tail wrasse, 
is a fish found in the Pacific Ocean including the Hawaiian and Midway islands.

References

Red tail wrasse
Fish described in 1958
Taxa named by John Ernest Randall